BankLink is an accounting service for GST and end of year tax in Australia and New Zealand. 

BankLink electronically delivers bank transaction data to the accountant. They then use it to transact as many times as possible.  The accountant can then find out, from the client, the nature of any uncoded transactions using BankLink's electronic reports. This coded data is then used to prepare management reports and various other reports used for tax compliance purposes.

History 
BankLink started its business in 1986. The BankLink service is now used by more than 1,300 accounting practices in New Zealand and 3,400 in Australia. BankLink launched in the United Kingdom in 2011. In 2012 BankLink partnered with MYOB so that BankLink will provide bank data to be used in MYOB's accounting products. It was a privately owned business and is based in Auckland, New Zealand, until MYOB purchased it in June 2013. 

Before its acquisition by MYOB, BankLink was a partner of Rowing New Zealand, but they partnered with Bankstream after that.

References

External links
 - Australia
 - New Zealand
 - United Kingdom
 - MYOB Australia
 - MYOB New Zealand

Financial services companies established in 1986
Financial services companies of Australia